Dilakko (before 1961: Σέσο Seso) is a village of the Zagori municipality, northwestern Greece. Before the 2011 local government reform it was part of the municipality of East Zagori. The 2011 census recorded 19 inhabitants in the village. The village of Dilakko is a part of the community of Elatochori.

See also
List of settlements in the Ioannina regional unit

References

Populated places in Ioannina (regional unit)